Policewoman Centerfold is a 1983 television movie starring Melody Anderson and Ed Marinaro, loosely based on the story of police officer Barbara Schantz who posed for Playboy magazine in 1982.

Cast
 Melody Anderson as Jennifer Oaks
 Ed Marinaro as Nick Velano
 Donna Pescow as Sissy Owens
 Greg Monaghan as Chris Sands
 Bert Remsen as Captain David Buckman
 David Spielberg as Steve Jones
 Michael LeClair as Skip Oaks
 Andrea Howard as Margo Syms
 David Haskell as Todd Walker
 Jerry Supiran as Tommy Oaks

Reception
It first aired on Monday, October 17, 1983, and was the seventh most-watched prime time program in the United States for the week, out-drawing Monday Night Football.  It was rebroadcast in early July 1985, during the American summer TV season, when it was the most-viewed program of the week.

Upon its release, one review noted that the lead role "is not one offering much opportunity for an acting tour de force, but Anderson does manage to make the woman an understandable, sympathetic figure."  It was also noted that the subject matter of the movie was a plain attempt at "exploitation and titillation" to get ratings (which plainly worked), although the title and hype did not reflect that that movie actually "downplays the sensational aspects of the matter to concentrate on the motivation of the woman and the aftermath of the photos publication."

Release
The film was released on VHS in 1986.

References

External links 
 
 Movie trailer

1983 television films
1983 films
American television films